Hethlon was a biblical city on the boundary of Palestine. It has two references in the Bible, both of which are in the Book of Ezekiel. It is described as a fearful dwelling. It has been identified as modern Heitela in Syria, although theologian Tremper Longman claimed recently that its exact location is still unknown.

See also 
Ezekiel 47
Ezekiel 48
Land of Israel

References 

Hebrew Bible cities